Donald Macdonell or MacDonell may refer to:

 Donald Macdonell (Upper Canada politician) (1778–1861), political figure in Upper Canada
 Donald Macdonell (Australian politician) (1862–1911), Australian politician
 Donald Greenfield MacDonell (1849–1916), lawyer and political figure in Ontario, Canada
 Donald Æneas MacDonell (1794–1879), soldier and political figure in Upper Canada